Andrew Marr's History of the World is a 2012 BBC documentary television series presented by Andrew Marr that covers 70,000 years of world history from before the beginning of human civilisation, as African nomadic peoples spread out around the world and settled down to become the first farmers, up to the twentieth century, in 1998.

The series is noted for its elaborate, Hollywood-like recreations of many of the people and events on which Marr frames his story.  Great care was taken in accurate costumes and the use of the original language of those portrayed. To this are added elaborate digital effects, such as a recreation of the Palace of Knossos or the diversionary channels dug to control flooding of the Yellow River.

Episodes

Production
Producer Robin Dashwood on the BBC website provides background to how the series was made, beginning with financial limitations on travel which set them seeking one location "which would furnish us the whole world":

Dashwood also notes the diversity of actors available: "Luckily Cape Town is a bit of a melting pot: African, Chinese, European, Middle Eastern you name it, they've got it [except Aborigines]."  Though crowds are often shown, this was done with the help of computers: "Budgetary considerations meant we had to make a limited number of performers seem like many more - a crowd of 15 often had to stand in for a crowd of 1500. The magic of computer graphics often filled in the missing 1485 – but it was always a challenge."

Book 
 Marr, Andrew (2014). A History of the World. Pan Macmillan. .

References

External links

2010s British documentary television series
2012 British television series debuts
2012 British television series endings
BBC television documentaries about prehistoric and ancient history
BBC television documentaries about history during the 16th and 17th centuries
BBC television documentaries about history during the 18th and 19th centuries
BBC television documentaries about history during the 20th Century
BBC television documentaries about medieval history